The Almeria Club Recordings is the forty-ninth studio album by American musician Hank Williams, Jr. This album was released on January 8, 2002 on the Curb Records label. He recorded most of the songs at "The Almeria Club",  a club that his father, Hank Williams, recorded several songs himself. Kid Rock as well as Uncle Kracker appear on the song "The 'F' Word" giving background vocals.

Track listing
All tracks composed by Hank Williams, Jr.; except where indicated
 "Last Pork Chop" (Thunderhead Hawkins)  – 3:23
 "Go Girl Go"  (Gene Wells, Hank Williams, Jr., Jessie Staggs) – 3:21
 "The 'F' Word"   – 3:21
 "If the Good Lord's Willin' (And the Creeks Don't Rise)" (Hank Williams, Hank Williams, Jr.) – 4:44
 "X-Treme Country"  – 3:07
 "Last Pork Chop" (Thunderhead Hawkins) [Acoustic]  – 4:25
 "Big Top Women"  – 3:10
 "The Cheatin' Hotel"  – 5:12
 "Outdoor Lovin' Man"  – 4:04
 "Almeria Jam"  – 2:03
 "Tee Tot Song"  – 3:55
 "Cross on the Highway"  – 7:09
 "America Will Survive" [Studio Version]  – 4:51

Personnel
James Burton - electric guitar
Ira Dean - bass guitar, background vocals
Ricky Fataar - drums
Larry Franklin - fiddle
Jimmy Hall - harmonica
Steve Herman - trumpet
Don Herron - fiddle, lap steel guitar
John Hinchey - trombone
Jim Horn - saxophone
James "Hutch" Hutchinson - bass guitar and upright bass (tracks 1-13)
Kid Rock - electric guitar and background vocals on "The 'F' Word"
"Cowboy" Eddie Long - steel guitar
Heidi Newfield - harmonica, background vocals
Jimmy Nichols - keyboards
Kenny Olson - electric guitar 
Chris Thile - mandolin
Wayne Turner - electric guitar
Uncle Kracker - background vocals on "The 'F' Word"
Rick Vito - dobro, acoustic guitar, electric guitar
Sara Watkins - fiddle
Sean Watkins - acoustic guitar
Hank Williams Jr. - banjo, dobro, lead vocals
Reese Wynans - Hammond organ, piano
Tramp - fiddle, mandolin

Charts

Weekly charts

Year-end charts

External links
 Hank Williams, Jr's Official Website
 Record Label

References

2002 albums
Hank Williams Jr. albums
Curb Records albums